Loyd Daniel Gilman Grossman  (born 16 September 1950) is an American-British author, broadcaster and cultural campaigner who has mainly worked in the United Kingdom. He is well known for presenting the BBC programme MasterChef from 1990 to 2000 and for being the co-presenter, with David Frost, of the BBC and ITV panel show Through the Keyhole from 1987 until 2003, visiting homes of many UK and US celebrities.

Early life and education 
Grossman was born in Boston, Massachusetts, on 16 September 1950 and raised in Marblehead, Massachusetts, the son of David K. Grossman, a Jewish antique dealer and Helen Katherine (née Gilman). Many members of his father's family were art and antiques dealers in and around Boston. His cousin was Ram Dass, the spiritual teacher and author. His initial education was at the General John Glover School in Marblehead, and then at Marblehead High School. He graduated from Boston University with a B.A. in history before travelling to the United Kingdom in 1975 to study at the London School of Economics, where he received a master's degree in economic history. He later returned to university at Magdalene College, Cambridge, where he studied history of art, and received his MPhil and a PhD.

Career

Journalism
Grossman became involved with journalism as an undergraduate in Boston writing for a number of ‘underground’ and music publications including Boston After Dark, Fusion, Vibrations, the New York Review of Rock and Rolling Stone. After graduation from the LSE he joined the staff of Harpers & Queen as design editor and subsequently went to work for The Sunday Times as contributing editor. He has written for many British newspapers and is a regular contributor to Country Life. While at Harpers & Queen he was also the magazine's restaurant critic, a pursuit which he continued for thirteen years also writing about restaurants for GQ and The Sunday Times.

Television
Grossman's television career began in 1983 as one of the regular faces on TV-am presenting among other things a short segment, Through the Keyhole, which he devised along with Kevin Sim and David Frost. Through the Keyhole transferred to primetime on ITV in 1987 and scored some of ITV's highest viewing figures for light entertainment. Grossman continued on the show until 2003. He presented Masterchef from 1990 to 2000 and Junior Masterchef as well as a great number of other programmes including Loyd on Location, The History of British Sculpture, and Behind the Headlines. He also presented the BBC Radio 3 series Composers at Home.

Music

Grossman has a continuing career as a guitarist initially with punk band Jet Bronx And The Forbidden, who reached number 47 in the UK singles chart in December 1977 with "Ain't Doin' Nothing". He returned to playing music in 2008 at the Vienna Rebellion Punk Festival. He subsequently formed a new band, The New Forbidden, with Valentine Guinness. The New Forbidden have appeared at Glastonbury eight times. Grossman also appears as a guest artist with Ian Anderson and Jethro Tull when they play their annual concerts in aid of English cathedrals.

Food

In 1995, Grossman introduced his own brand of cooking sauces which became the most successful UK celebrity sauce brand. The sauces are produced by arrangement with Premier Foods.

In 2000, he was asked to head a project to improve the quality of food served in British NHS hospitals. Although some newspapers reported that the project had a £40 million budget, Grossman pointed out in a Nursing Times interview that almost all of that money was earmarked for the ward housekeeping programme. He was disappointed that there seemed to be little real money or political will to change hospital catering.

Heritage and the arts
Grossman's lifelong interest in history, the arts and heritage has involved him in a number of organisations. He is a former commissioner of the Museums and Galleries Commission, a former commissioner of English Heritage (where he was chairman of the Museums Advisory Committee and the Blue Plaques Panel), and of the Royal Commission on the Historical Monuments of England. He was a founding member of the Museums, Libraries and Archives Council, past chairman of the National Museums Liverpool, deputy chairman of Liverpool European Capital of Culture, chairman of Culture Northwest and of the Public Monuments and Sculpture Association. He founded the 24 Hour Museum (now Culture24).

He was chairman of the University for the Creative Arts from 2008 to 2012 and a member of the Court of Governors of the LSE from 1996 to 2009 and is now an emeritus governor. He was deputy chair of the Royal Drawing School, a member of the Council of the British School at Rome, a member of the board of the Association of Leading Visitor Attractions and a governor of the Building Crafts College. Grossman was chairman of the Churches Conservation Trust from 2007 to 2016 and in 2009 became chairman of the Heritage Alliance – the UK organisation that represents more than 100 leading non-governmental organisations across the heritage sector. In 2015, he was elected for an unprecedented third term as chairman. In 2016, he was appointed chairman of The Royal Parks.

Current appointments

Grossman is chairman of The Royal Parks, having been reappointed for a four-year term in July 2020, to run from 5 July 2020 to 4 July 2024. He is also chairman of Gresham College,  a governor of the British Institute at Florence, a governor of the Compton Verney House Trust and a trustee of the Warburg Charitable Trust. He is president of the Arts Society (formerly NADFAS) and patron of the Association for Heritage Interpretation.

Other activities
Grossman is a Liveryman of The Worshipful Company of Carpenters, an Honorary Liveryman of The Worshipful Company of Glaziers and Past Master of the Worshipful Company of Arts Scholars. He is a fellow of a number of learned societies: The Society of Antiquaries, The Royal Historical Society, The Society of Antiquaries of Scotland and The Royal Society of Medicine.

Personal life 
Grossman was married to Deborah Puttnam, the daughter of the film producer David Puttnam, from 1985 to 2004 and they have two daughters. Grossman is a keen scuba diver and a lifelong fan of the Boston Red Sox.

His Mid-Atlantic accent reflects his Boston origins and has frequently been the subject of parody including in adverts for his own sauces.

Awards and honours
Grossman was appointed an Officer of the Order of the British Empire in the 2003 Birthday Honours for services to patient care and was advanced to Commander of the Order of the British Empire in the 2015 Birthday Honours for services to heritage. He has Honorary doctorates from the University of Chester, the University of Lincoln and the University of Essex in recognition of his work for heritage and tourism.

Publications
 The Social History of Rock Music (1975)
 Harpers and Queen Guide to London's 100 Best Restaurants (1987)
 The Dog's Tale (1993)
 Loyd Grossman's Italian Journey (1994)
 Courvoisier's Book of the Best (1994–96) - as editor
 The World on a Plate (1997)
 The 125 Best Recipes Ever (1998)
 Foodstuff (2002)
  An Elephant in Rome (2020)

References

External links
 Loyd Grossman Sauces official website
 Jet Bronx and the New Forbidden official myspace site

1950 births
Alumni of Magdalene College, Cambridge
Alumni of the London School of Economics
American emigrants to England
American male journalists
American restaurant critics
Boston University College of Arts and Sciences alumni
Commanders of the Order of the British Empire
Fellows of the Society of Antiquaries of London
Jewish American journalists
Living people
People from Marblehead, Massachusetts
Premier Foods brands
Naturalised citizens of the United Kingdom
British male journalists
British Jews
British television presenters
Marblehead High School alumni
People of the Royal Commission on the Historical Monuments of England
21st-century American Jews